Keen, Keen's, or Keens may refer to:

People 
Keen (surname)
Thomas Keens (1870-1953), British politician

Music and song 
 Keen (band), Italian band
 "Keen" (song), a single by That Petrol Emotion
 Keen Records, American record label
Keening, traditional Irish lament

Companies
 Keen (shoe company),  United States manufacturing company
 Keen's, Australian food brand
 Keen Engineering, Canadian consulting engineering firm
 Keens Steakhouse, a restaurant in New York City

Video games 
 "Keening", tool in video game The Elder Scrolls III: Morrowind
 Commander Keen, a series of video games developed by id Software in the early 1990s.

Other uses
 KEEN-CD, a low-power television station (channel 17) licensed to Las Vegas, Nevada, United States
 KZSF, former call sign KEEN, a radio station licensed to San Jose, California, United States
 Dillant–Hopkins Airport, ICAO code as KEEN, near Keene, New Hampshire, United States

See also 
 Keene (disambiguation)
 Kene
 Keane (disambiguation)
 Keening the traditional Irish and Scottish lament for the dead